Bellamya robertsoni is a species of large freshwater snail with a gill and an operculum, an aquatic gastropod mollusc in the family Viviparidae.

This species is found in Malawi and Mozambique.

References

Viviparidae
Taxonomy articles created by Polbot
Taxa named by Georg Ritter von Frauenfeld